Hair-Trigger Burke is a 1917 American silent Western film starring Harry Carey.

Cast
 Harry Carey
 Ted Brooks
 Claire Du Brey
 Vester Pegg
 William Steele (as William Gettinger)

See also
 Harry Carey filmography

References

External links
 

1917 films
1917 short films
American silent short films
American black-and-white films
1917 Western (genre) films
Films directed by Fred Kelsey
Silent American Western (genre) films
1910s American films
1910s English-language films